Sand is a village in Shahkot in Jalandhar district of Punjab State, India. The village is administrated by a sarpanch who is an elected representative of village as per Panchayati raj (India).

Demography 
As of 2011, Qadian has a total number of 157 houses and population of 787 of which include 399 are males while 388 are females according to the report published by Census India in 2011. Literacy rate of the village is 64.93%, lower than state average of 75.84%. The population of children under the age of 6 years is 77 which is 9.78% of total population of the village, and child sex ratio is approximately 1026 higher than state average of 846.

Most of the people are from Schedule Caste which constitutes 60.10% of total population in the village. The town does not have any Schedule Tribe population so far.

As per census 2011, 349 people were engaged in work activities out of the total population of the village which includes 250 males and 99 females. According to census survey report 2011, 88.54% workers describe their work as main work and 11.46% workers are involved in marginal activity providing livelihood for less than 6 months.

Transport 
Shahkot Malisian station is the nearest train station.

See also 
List of villages in India

References 

Villages in Jalandhar district